The girls' singles tournament of the 2015 Badminton Asia Junior Championships was held from July 1 to 5. The defending champions of the last edition was Akane Yamaguchi from Japan. He Bingjiao, Gregoria Mariska and Saena Kawakami were the top 3 seeded this year. He Bingjiao of China emerged as the champion after defeat Pornpawee Chochuwong of Thailand in the finals with the score 21–16, 21–17.

Seeded

  He Bingjiao (champion)
  Gregoria Mariska (3rd round)
  Saena Kawakami (quarter Finals)
  Ruselli Hartawan (1st round)
  Supanida Katethong (3rd round)
  Chen Yufei (3rd round)
  Natsuki Nidaira (quarter Finals)
  Pornpawee Chochuwong (final)

Draw

Finals

Top half

Section 1

Section 2

Section 3

Section 4

Bottom half

Section 5

Section 6

Section 7

Section 8

References

External links 
Main Draw

2015 Badminton Asia Junior Championships
Junior